La Choy (stylized La Choy 東) is a brand name of canned and prepackaged American Chinese food ingredients. The brand was purchased in 1990 from Beatrice Foods by ConAgra Foods during the LBO firm Kohlberg Kravis Roberts' dismantling of the company and is still currently a property of ConAgra.

Early history
The company was founded in 1922 by Dr. Ilhan New, later founder of Yuhan Corporation in South Korea, and Wallace J. "Wally" Smith from the University of Michigan. The first product, canned mung bean sprouts, was originally sold in Smith's Detroit, Michigan, grocery store.

New left the company for personal reasons in 1930, and Smith was killed by lightning in 1937. Regardless, the company flourished. By the late 1930s, management at the firm had developed a comprehensive line of food products, including bean sprouts, soy sauce, subgum, kumquats, water chestnuts, brown sauce, bamboo shoots, and chow mein noodles. 

The company capitalized on the growing fascination Americans had with East Asia, including an entirely different type of cuisine. In 1937, the company built its first manufacturing facility in Detroit, featuring  of production space.

Selling its Detroit plant to the federal government for the production of munitions, the proceeds from the sale enabled the company to start a new era in its history. In 1943, the Beatrice Creamery Co. purchased La Choy Food Products. 

On June 23, 1957, three principals of the La Choy company, all from Archbold, appeared as contestants on the TV panel show What's My Line. As all three men had Irish surnames (Muldoon, McCarthy, and McDonough), they managed to stump the panel.

Marketing and advertising
A popular advertising jingle from the 1970s  included the slogan "LaChoy makes Chinese food swing American."

Muppets
Early in his career, Jim Henson created a series of television commercials from 1965 to 1967 featuring a Full-Bodied Muppet character called Delbert the La Choy Dragon (performed by Frank Oz and voiced by Jim Henson) which used the catchphrase "quick cooked in dragon fire" to describe the product.

Delbert was accompanied in later commercials by a timid character named Mert (performed by Jim Henson). Delbert was one of Oz's few full-bodied Muppet performances, since he did not like performing in their costumes.

See also
 Mein gon (crunchy chow mein noodles)
 Chop suey
 Chow mein sandwich

Notes

External links
 Official website
 La Choy at ConAgra Foods
 Muldoon, McCarthy, and McDonough on What's My Line (June 23, 1957)

Conagra Brands brands
Products introduced in 1922
American Chinese cuisine
Noodles
American companies established in 1922
Food and drink companies established in 1922
1922 establishments in Michigan